The James Lee House is a historic house in Memphis, Tennessee, U.S.. It was built circa 1869 for James Lee, Sr., the founder of a river steamboat company and an iron works. It was later inherited by his son, James Lee, Jr., a maritime attorney. It has been listed on the National Register of Historic Places since October 2, 1978.

References

Houses on the National Register of Historic Places in Tennessee
Houses completed in 1869
Houses in Memphis, Tennessee